The 2021–22 Creighton Bluejays men's basketball team represented Creighton University in the 2021–22 NCAA Division I men's basketball season. The Bluejays were coached by 12th-year head coach Greg McDermott and played their home games at the CHI Health Center Omaha in Omaha, Nebraska, as members of the Big East Conference. They finished the season 23–12, 12–7 in Big East play to finish in fourth place. As the No. 4 seed in the Big East tournament, they defeated Marquette and Providence, before losing to Villanova in the Championship. They received an at-large bid to the NCAA tournament as the No. 9 seed in the Midwest Region, where they defeated San Diego State in the first round before losing to Kansas in the second round.

Previous season
The Bluejays finished the 2020–21 season 22–9, 14–6  to finish second in Big East play. They defeated Butler and UConn in the Big East tournament before losing to Georgetown in the championship game. They received an at-large bid to the NCAA tournament as the No. 5 seed in the West region. They defeated UC Santa Barbara and Ohio to advance to the Sweet Sixteen. This marked the first time Creighton had won consecutive games in the same tournament and the first time they had advanced to the Sweet Sixteen since 1974 when the tournament had 25 teams. There they lost to eventual National Runner-Up Gonzaga.

On March 4, 2021, head coach McDermott was suspended for using racially insensitive language to his team. On March 8, the school reinstated McDermott after only missing one game and allowing him to coach in the Big East and NCAA Tournaments. 

Marcus Zegarowski and Damien Jefferson were named to the All Big East Conference first and second teams, respectively. Denzel Mahoney was named as an All-Big East Honorable Mention. Zegarowski also earned Honorable Mention All-America honors from the Associated Press.

Offseason

Departures

2021 recruiting class

Incoming transfers

Roster

Schedule and results

|-
!colspan=12 style=| Exhibition

|-
!colspan=12 style=| Non-conference regular season

{{CBB schedule entry
| date         = November 16, 2021
| time         = 6:00 p.m.
| nonconf      = yes
| away         = yes
| rank         = 
| opponent     = Nebraska
| opprank      = 
| site_stadium = Pinnacle Bank Arena
| site_cityst  = Lincoln, NE
| gamename     = Rivalry/Gavitt Tipoff Games
| tv           = FS1
| score        = 77–69
| highscorer   = Nembhard
| points       = 22
| highrebounder= Hawkins
| rebounds     = 10
| highassister = 2 ''Tied| assists      = 5
| attend       = 15,939
| record       = 3–0
}}

|-
!colspan=9 style=|Big East regular season

|-
!colspan=12 style=| Big East tournament

|-
!colspan=9 style="|NCAA tournament

Awards and honors

Big East Conference honors

All-Big East Awards
Freshman of the Year: Ryan Nembhard
Defensive Player of the Year: Ryan Kalkbrenner

All-Big East Second Team
Ryan Hawkins

All-Big East Honorable Mention
Ryan Kalkbrenner

Big East All-Freshman Team
Trey Alexander
Arthur Kaluma
Ryan NembhardSources'''

References

Creighton Bluejays men's basketball seasons
Creighton
Creighton
Creighton
Creighton